The East Indies, or Indies for short, is used to describe the lands of South and Southeast Asia.

Indies may also refer to:
Canadian Independent Music Awards, also known as the Indies, a Canadian award
Indies Records, a Czech record label
West Indies,  the islands of North Atlantic Ocean and the Caribbean

See also
Indi (disambiguation)
India (disambiguation)
Indian (disambiguation)
Indie (disambiguation); "indie" is a short for "independent"
Indy (disambiguation)